The Ministry of Culture of Peru is the government ministry in charge of the promotion of peruvian culture and identity. It was created on 20 July 2010, during the government of Alan García.

The inaugural minister was Juan Ossio Acuña after his appointment on 4 September 2010. , the culture minister is Silvana Robles.

List of Culture Ministers

External links 
Official website

Peru
Peru, Culture
Culture
Peruvian culture